The Women's heptathlon competition at the 2002 Asian Games in Busan, South Korea was held on 7–8 October at the Busan Asiad Main Stadium.

Schedule
All times are Korea Standard Time (UTC+09:00)

Records

Results

100 metres hurdles 
 Wind: +0.1 m/s

High jump

Shot put

200 metres 
 Wind: −0.5 m/s

Long jump

Javelin throw

800 metres

Summary

References

External links 
Results

Athletics at the 2002 Asian Games
2002